is a Japanese manga series written and illustrated by Yuhta Nishio. It was serialized in Shogakukan's Hibana seinen manga magazine from March 2015 to August 2017, when the manga ceased its publication, and the series finished in its third and last compiled tankōbon volume released in January 2018. The manga has been licensed in North America by Viz Media.

Publication
After Hours is written and illustrated by Yuhta Nishio. The manga was serialized Shogakukan's Hibana seinen manga magazine from March 6, 2015, to August 7, 2017, when the magazine ceased its publication. The series finished in its third and last compiled tankōbon volume. The three volumes were released from October 7, 2015 to January 12, 2018.

In North America, Viz Media announced the English language release of the manga in October 2016. The three volumes were released from June 13, 2017 to December 11, 2018.

Volume list

References

Further reading

External links

LGBT in anime and manga
Seinen manga
Shogakukan manga
Viz Media manga
Yuri (genre) anime and manga